Border Radio is a 1987 independent film directed by Allison Anders, Dean Lent and Kurt Voss.

Summary
A document of the last days West Coast punk rock, the story follows two musicians and a roadie who haven't been paid rob money from a club and one flees to Mexico leaving his wife and daughter behind.

Production
The trio met while making Wim Wenders' 1984 film Paris Texas and drafted a number of 80s celebrities like Wenders Daryl Hannah for financial support but most of it came from character actor (and family friend of Voss) Vic Tayback.

Soundtrack
The film features music from cowpunk bands and artists, including the Flesh Eaters, Green on Red, John Doe, the Divine Horsemen, X, and the Blasters.

Cast
 Chris D. as Jeff Bailey
 Chris Shearer as Chris 
 Dave Alvin as Dave
 Devon Anders as Devon
 Luanna Anders as Lu
 Iris Berry as Scenester
 Julie Christensen as Door Girl
 John Doe as Dean
 Eddie Flowers as Thug
 Green on Red as Band in Club
 Texacala Jones as Babysitter
 Chuck Shepard as Expatriate
 Sebastian Sopeland as Thug
 Craig Stark as Thug

See also
Border blaster
1987 in film
DIY culture

References

External links
 
 
Essay on BORDER RADIO at New Texture
Border Radio: Where Punk Lived an essay by Chris Morris at the Criterion Collection
Excerpt

1987 films
American independent films
1987 directorial debut films
1987 drama films
American drama road movies
1980s drama road movies
1987 independent films
Films about music and musicians
Films directed by Allison Anders
Punk films
1980s English-language films
1980s American films
English-language drama films